Citrobacter rodentium is a Gram-negative species of bacteria. It infects the intestinal tracts of rodents, and infrequently is an opportunistic pathogen in humans.

References

Further reading

External links
LPSN entry for Citrobacter rodentium
Type strain of Citrobacter rodentium at BacDive - the Bacterial Diversity Metadatabase

rodentium
Bacteria described in 1996